"Legend of the Sea Devils" is the second of the 2022 specials of the British science fiction television programme Doctor Who, which was broadcast on BBC One on 17 April 2022. The episode was written by Ella Road and Chris Chibnall, and directed by Haolu Wang. It follows "Eve of the Daleks", serving as an Easter special, and stars Jodie Whittaker in her penultimate episode as the Thirteenth Doctor, alongside Mandip Gill as Yasmin Khan and John Bishop as Dan Lewis.

Plot 
In 1807 China, the pirate Madam Ching raids a village and, using a gem, unwittingly releases the Sea Devil Marsissus from a stone statue. Marsissus kills Ying Wai, the young Ying Ki's father, who was tasked with keeping Marsissus contained. The Doctor, Yaz, and Dan arrive to confront Marsissus and investigate the village. Ying Ki and Dan take the gem, split off, and swim to Ching's ship to take revenge. Ching reveals she is after the treasure of the legendary sailor Ji-Hun (who disappeared searching for the Flor de la Mar treasure) because she needs it to pay the ransom for her kidnapped crew. The Sea Devils unleash a leviathan, the Huasen, on Ching's ship.

The Doctor and Yaz take the TARDIS back 274 years and witness a Sea Devil betraying Ji-Hun aboard the latter's ship. Returning to 1807, they try to find the shipwreck to no avail. The Huasen takes the TARDIS to the Sea Devils’ undersea lair. The Sea Devils seek the gem, the Keystone, to execute their plan. Pretending they have it, the Doctor and Yaz use it as leverage to board Ji-Hun's ship, which has been retrofitted with alien technology. They are shown Ji-Hun, who has been kept in stasis. He reveals he tricked the Sea Devils in their deal. Marsissus calls the Doctor's bluff, claiming the Huasen has located the Keystone.

Ji-Hun, the Doctor, and Yaz board Ching's ship. Ji-Hun finds out Ying Ki is the descendant of his most trusted crew member Lei Bao and reveals he gave the Keystone to Lei, who escaped his ship. Marsissus seizes the Keystone from Ying Ki just as the Doctor realises the Sea Devils plan to use it to flood Earth.

The protagonists fight the Sea Devils aboard Ching's ship. The Doctor tampers with the technology on Ji-Hun's ship, but destroying it requires two cables to be held together. The Doctor volunteers to stay back while the others escape, but Ji-Hun offers to sacrifice himself instead.

Madam Ching announces she has recovered enough treasure to pay the ransom and will make Ying Ki a member of her crew. The Doctor takes Yaz and Dan ashore. Dan leaves a message for his love interest Diane and is surprised when she calls him back. The Doctor, who had acknowledged Yaz's feelings for her on Ji-Hun's ship, solemnly expresses her wish that she could spend more time with Yaz.

Production

Development 
"Legend of the Sea Devils" was written by newcomer Ella Road, and showrunner and executive producer Chris Chibnall. The episode sees the return of the Sea Devils for the first time since Warriors of the Deep (1984).

Casting 
Jodie Whittaker stars as the Thirteenth Doctor, alongside Mandip Gill as Yasmin Khan and John Bishop as Dan Lewis. The casting of Crystal Yu, Arthur Lee and Marlowe Chan-Reeves was announced alongside their appearances in a trailer following the credits of "Eve of the Daleks".

Filming 
The episode was directed by Haolu Wang. The first two 2022 specials were filmed in the same production run as the thirteenth series. Filming for those specials concluded in August 2021.

Publicity 
As part of the promotion for the episode, Scottish musician Nathan Evans was featured on the official Doctor Who YouTube channel, singing an adaptation of the sea ballad "Wellerman".

Broadcast and reception

Broadcast 
"Legend of the Sea Devils" was first broadcast on 17 April 2022 (Easter Sunday) and is the second of the three 2022 specials.

Ratings 
The episode was watched by 2.20 million viewers overnight, becoming the eleventh most-watched programme of the day. The episode received an Audience Appreciation Index score of 76. The final consolidated ratings for the episode were 3.47 million viewers, the lowest viewing figure in the programme's post-2005 history, and the second-lowest in its entire history, only ahead of the first episode of Battlefield (1989), which received 3.1 million viewers.

Critical reception 

On Rotten Tomatoes, a review aggregator website, 57% of seven critics gave "Legend of the Sea Devils" a positive review, with an average rating of 4.90 out of 10. On Metacritic, another aggregator, the episode received a weighted average score of 51 based on six reviews, indicating "mixed or average reviews". Benji Wilson, writing in The Daily Telegraph, said that his kids thought the Sea Devils were "cute" which undermined the perceived scariness of the episode. However, he praised the "nascent relationship between the Doctor and Yaz" commenting that the interplay between the two characters was "genuinely affecting".

Awarding it three stars out of five, Martin Belam of The Guardian said the episode "promised a swashbuckling Easter special, and it partially delivered", but he felt that the scenes between the Doctor and Yaz towards the end  "didn’t necessarily ring true".

Home media 
"Eve of the Daleks" and "Legend of the Sea Devils" received a joint DVD and Blu-ray release in Region 2/B on 23 May 2022, in Region 1/A on 28 June 2022, and in Region 4/B on 13 July 2022. The episode was included in the home media set for the 2022 specials, to be released in Region 2/B on 7 November 2022.

Soundtrack 

On 18 November 2022, composer Segun Akinola announced that selected pieces of the score from this special would be digitally released on 9 December 2022. A physical CD release containing all 3 soundtracks of the 2022 specials is also set for release on 13 January 2023.

References

External links 

 
 
 

Thirteenth Doctor episodes
2022 British television episodes
British television specials
Doctor Who stories set on Earth
Doctor Who pseudohistorical serials
Easter television episodes
Television episodes set in China
Fiction set in 1533
Fiction set in 1807